Shen Che-tsai (1926-27 September 2017) was a Taiwanese painter. He studied under Liao Chi-chun and Kuo Po-chuan. He was the councilor of Tainan Art Research Association and a professor at Tainan Woman's College of Arts and Technology. Shen was a prolific Taiwanese artist known for his paintings in the permanent collection of the National Taiwan Museum of Fine Arts--Person Sitting (1949), Cat Lady (1985), and Outskirts of San Francisco (1986). Additionally, his works can also be viewed at the Tainan Art Museum.

Shen's artwork represents a fusion of native Taiwan abstract expressionism of the 1970s and influences of American realism typified by Andrew Wyeth during the 1980s. In particular, he is known for his drawings and paintings of people, young ladies, ballet dancers, buildings, plants, and flowers and injecting a particular romance into his art. Largely eschewing political themes, Shen preferred paintings that evoked fondness and freedom.

Shen was born in Tainan in 1926. He entered the Tainan Second High School of Tainan Prefecture in 1938. Displaying artistic talent at a young age, Shen's painting, The Liu’s Household (oil on canvas) was displayed at the Tai-yang Art Exhibition in 1941 and Ming-lun Hall (watercolor) was displayed at the Taiwan Government Fine Arts Exhibition in 1943. Shen earned national recognition as an artist through numerous exhibitions and competitions and is considered a proven member of the Taiwan art scene. Shen died on 27 September 2017.

Exhibitions
Palace (Fu) Fine Arts Exhibition
Taiyang Fine Arts Exhibition. 1941
Taiwan Governmental Fine Arts Exhibition. 1943
National Taiwan Museum of Fine Arts. 1995
The World of Shen Che-Tsai's Paintings. 2017

References 

1926 births
2017 deaths
20th-century Taiwanese painters
Artists from Tainan